Calosoma marginalis is a species of ground beetle in the subfamily of Carabinae. It was described by Casey in 1897.

References

marginalis
Beetles described in 1897